Joe Lai Wing-ho (born 1973) is a Hong Kong politician. He is a former vice chairman of the Wong Tai Sin District Council for Wang Tau Hom and current deputy secretary-general of the Democratic Alliance for the Betterment and Progress of Hong Kong.

Biography 
Lai was educated at the Hong Kong Baptist University where he was a captain of the university's rowing team. He was named the best newcoming athlete by the Hong Kong Amateur Rowing Association in 1995. 

He first contested in the 1999 District Council elections in Wang Tau Hom against Bruce Liu of the Hong Kong Association for Democracy and People's Livelihood (ADPL). He was elected with 2,122 votes, compared to Liu's 1,829. He was re-elected in 2003, 2007, 2011 and 2015 until he was defeated by Civic Party's Carmen Lau Ka-man in the 2019 District Council elections in the city-wide pro-democracy landslide.

From 2016 to 2019, Lai was the vice chairman of the Wong Tai Sin District Council. He was also appointed member of the Administrative Appeals Board and Hong Kong Consumer Council.

Lai ran in the Legislative Council elections in 2008, 2012 and 2016 with the DAB ticket as a minor candidate in Kowloon East, successfully helped Chan Kam-lam and Wilson Or to be elected to the legislature respectively. In the 2020 Legislative Council election after incumbent Wilson Or abruptly decided not to seek for re-election, Lai was nominated by the DAB to succeed Or in Kowloon East.

References

1973 births
Living people
Alumni of Hong Kong Baptist University
District councillors of Wong Tai Sin District
Democratic Alliance for the Betterment and Progress of Hong Kong politicians
Hong Kong male rowers
Members of the Election Committee of Hong Kong, 2017–2021
Members of the Election Committee of Hong Kong, 2021–2026